A bead is a  decorative object.

Bead may also refer to:
 Bead (woodworking)
 Beadwork, an ornament or utensil made from beads
 Ferrite bead, a typically non-decorative passive electric component used to suppress high frequency noise in electronic circuits
 Anal beads,  a sex toy consisting of multiple spheres or balls attached together in series
 Bead test, a type of chemical analysis
 Bead method, a process of cell disruption for releasing biological molecules contained in cells
 Tire bead is a term for the edge of a tire that sits on the wheel
 Weld bead, deposit of filler metal from a single welding pass
 Bead lily, a common name for several flowering plant species in genus Clintonia

See also
 Bead-rim pottery